Nina Kemppel (born October 14, 1970) is an American cross-country skier who competed from 1992 to 2003. Her best World Cup finish was 14th twice, both earned in 2001.

Kemppel also competed in four Winter Olympics, earning her best finish of 13th in the 4 × 5 km relay at Salt Lake City in 2002. Her best finish at the FIS Nordic World Ski Championships was 22nd in the 5 km + 5 km combined pursuit at Lahti in 2001.

Cross-country skiing results
All results are sourced from the International Ski Federation (FIS).

Olympic Games

World Championships

a.  Cancelled due to extremely cold weather.

World Cup

Season standings

References

External links

1970 births
American female cross-country skiers
Cross-country skiers at the 1992 Winter Olympics
Cross-country skiers at the 1994 Winter Olympics
Cross-country skiers at the 1998 Winter Olympics
Cross-country skiers at the 2002 Winter Olympics
Living people
Olympic cross-country skiers of the United States
21st-century American women